Bertrand du Pontavice de Heussey (19 December 1892 – 16 May 1953) was a French bobsledder. He competed in the four-man event at the 1928 Winter Olympics.

References

External links
 

1892 births
1953 deaths
French male bobsledders
Olympic bobsledders of France
Bobsledders at the 1928 Winter Olympics
Sportspeople from Angers